The 2015–16 I-League U18 Final Round will be the sixth final round series at the end of the I-League U18 season. The final round will begin on 27 January 2016 and culminate on 10 February 2016 with the final. AIFF Elite Academy won the title by defeating Tata Football Academy 2–0 in the final.

Qualification

Group A

Fixtures and Results

Group B

Fixtures and Results

Bracket
All times are Indian Standard Time (IST) – UTC+05:30.

Semi-finals

Third Place

Final

External links

References

See also
 2015–16 I-League
 2015–16 I-League 2nd Division Final Round

U18
I-League U18 seasons
2015–16 in Indian football